Astragalus ertterae is a rare species of milkvetch known by the common name Walker Pass milkvetch. It is endemic to California, where it is known from only three occurrences near Walker Pass in the Sierra Nevada.

Description 
Astragalus ertterae is hairy perennial herb with a stem no more than 10 centimeters long, much of which grows underground. There are 4 or 5 leaves which are a few centimeters long and made up of several oval-shaped leaflets. The dense inflorescence holds up to 17 cream-colored flowers, each about a centimeter long. The fruit is a swollen, hairless legume pod which dries to a leathery texture.

External links
CalFlora Database: Astragalus ertterae (Walker Pass milk vetch)
Jepson Manual eFlora (TJM2) treatment - Astragalus ertterae
The Nature Conservancy
USDA Plants Profile for Astragalus ertterae (Walker Pass milk vetch)
BLM Profile of Astragalus ertterae
{http://calphotos.berkeley.edu/cgi-bin/img_query?where-taxon=Astragalus+ertterae&where-anno=1 UC Photos gallery — Astragalus ertterae]

ertterae
Endemic flora of California
Flora of the Sierra Nevada (United States)
Natural history of Kern County, California
Critically endangered flora of California